Kevin Timothy Furey was a Democratic Party member of the Montana House of Representatives, he represented District 91 from 2004 to 2007. Kevin resigned his seat in October 2007.

External links
Montana House of Representatives - Kevin Furey official MT State Legislature website
Project Vote Smart - Representative Kevin Timothy Furey (MT) profile
Follow the Money - Kevin Furey
2008 2006 2004 campaign contributions
 Missoulian: GOP promises more voter challenges
 Campus Progress
 Montana Hero
 Democrats give elder Furey nod

Democratic Party members of the Montana House of Representatives
1983 births
Living people